The fifth season of the reality television series Black Ink Crew aired on VH1 from January 18, 2017 until May 3, 2017. It chronicles the daily operations and staff drama at an African American-owned and operated tattoo shop in Harlem, New York.

Cast

Main
Ceaser Emanuel
Dutchess Lattimore
O'Shit Duncan
Sky Day
Donna Lombardi
Ted Ruks

Recurring
Walt Miller
Melody Mitchell
Miss Kitty
Young Bae
Tiffany Perez
Nikki Ducan
Kevin Laroy

Episodes

References

2017 American television seasons
Black Ink Crew